José Ramón Gurruchaga Ezama (March 29, 1931, Barakaldo – April 11, 2017) was a Roman Catholic bishop.

Ordained to the priesthood in 1961, Gurruchaga Ezama served as bishop of the Diocese of Huaraz, Peru, from 1987 to 1996. He then served as bishop of the Diocese of Lurin from 1996 to 2006.

Notes

1931 births
2017 deaths
21st-century Roman Catholic bishops in Peru
20th-century Roman Catholic bishops in Peru
Roman Catholic bishops of Lurín
Roman Catholic bishops of Huaraz